Punrasar Balaji is a holy site dedicated to the Hindu deity Hanuman in Rajasthan, India.

Temple
Punrasar Balaji temple was established on Jaisth Sudhi Purnima of Vikram Samvat 1775. This place is surrounded by the sand dunes and is about 57 km away from Bikaner.  Besides the main Nij Temple, there is also a statue of Hanumanji at the tree of Khejdi. At Khejdi, the ancient Hindu custom of Jhadula (cutting the hairs of new born children) takes place. Churma Prasadi, a sweet dish made up of wheat flour, butter and sugar is provided to the devotees of by the Pujari and his family members as the prasad. The prasad is first offered to Hanumanji for bhog and is then distributed to the devotees.

Three famous fairs are held every year in Punrasar. They take place on Chaitra Sudhi Purnima, Asoj Sudhi Purnima and the month of Bhadrapad each. There are many rooms situated in the temple premises which are available for the devotees at no cost. There also exists a newly constructed Dharamshala having A.C. and Non A.C. Rooms named Jairam Dharamshala. A Bhojnalaya(for food) is also running by Temple governing Body ( i.e. Mandir sri Punrasar Hanumanji Pujari Trust) at free of Cost which is famous for its delicious food.

Location
Punrasar is a part of Bikaner district in Rajasthan and it is situated on the National Highway 11. It is 57 km away from Bikaner, 43 km from Shri Dungargarh and 15 km away from Seruna.

History
According to the legend, a famine took place in Punrasar in 1774. The people started fleeing in search of food and wages. Jairam Das Bothra, a resident of Punrasar, went to Punjab in search of grain. When he was leaving with laden sacks on a camel cart, the camel's leg got broken and it was unable to walk. Bothra convinced his colleagues to go back to the village and then he went to sleep. Suddenly he felt as if someone was calling him; he got awoken and looked around but could not find anyone. He went to sleep but heard the same sound again, and he still did not found anyone. He remembered Hanuman and folded his hands, asking the one who was making that sound to appear. Then Hanuman appeared as a pandit and said,"O devotee! I know that you are in trouble, but as from now on all your troubles are solved". After saying this he pointed out to the Hanuman statue and asked Bothra to take the statue with him and establish it in the village, adding that this will solve all his troubles. Bothra replied that his camel's leg is broken so he cannot move on. Then the pandit said that his camel is alright, and Bothra was astonished to see that his camel was fine and ready to go. He took Hanuman's statue with him and established it. The pandit told Bothra that he himself or his family members would have to take care of the deity. Since then the successors of Bothra are taking care of the temple. The Bothra family belongs to the Jain Bothra Baniya.

Hanuman temples
Hindu temples in Rajasthan